The All India Station Masters' Association (AISMA) (Regd. No. NDD/09) is an Indian trade union representing the Station Masters of Indian Railways. Formed in 1953, it is among the best examples of work-category based unions in the Indian railway industry.    AISMA  represents Assistant Station Masters (ASMs), Station Masters (SMs), Station Managers (SMRs) and Transportation Inspectors (TIs), numbering to 37000.

With all sincere efforts of CEC Team, the long pending Demands such as Minimum Grade Pay of Rs.4200,and maximum GP 5400, Uniform Allowance, Condonation of Break in Service of SWR are some of  Milestones Achievements, in the Indian Railways Trade Unions.

On 6 January 2018, it proposed to conduct Eastern Maha Sammelan, under the impression "AISMA for Development".

In the Central Executives Meeting held at Bhubaneswar on 19,20 August 2017, the following Office Bearers were recognized for their  meritorious service:

Sh.B.P. Kumarasamy GS SWR honoured with "Man of the CEC"

Sh. D. K. Arora GS CR and Sh. Pramod Kumar  GS ECR shared the "Best GS" Award

Sh. Pankaj.Kr.Jhr GS SER honoured with "Best Upcoming GS"

Sh.Rajender. P. Ranakoti DS MB/NR honoured with "Best Divisional Secretary"

Facebook group created for instant messaging and as well for the audio visual news to its members.

See also
 Indian Railways

References

External links
 Official Website

Trade unions in Indian Railways
Organisations based in Delhi
Trade unions established in 1953
1953 establishments in India